Back horse may link to:

Equestrianism, or horseback riding
Horse training or "backing" a horse
Back (horse)
Crime in Italy